James Hurtubise (December 5, 1932 – January 6, 1989) was an American race car driver who raced in USAC Champ Cars (including the Indianapolis 500), as well as sprint cars and stock cars (USAC and NASCAR). He was from the Buffalo suburb of North Tonawanda, New York.  Hurtubise enjoyed a lot of success in sprint cars, champ dirt cars, and stock cars, but never achieved the success at the Indy 500 that his rookie qualifying run promised when he out qualified pole sitter Eddie Sachs by three mph, nearly breaking the 150 mph mark. "Herk" was a fan favorite throughout much of his career because of his fun-loving attitude and his hard driving style.

Hurtubise raced in the USAC Championship Car series in the 1959–1968 and 1970–1974 seasons, with 97 career starts. He finished in the top ten 38 times, with 4 victories, in 1959 at Sacramento, 1960 at Langhorne, and 1961 and 1962 at Springfield. In 1964, after suffering serious burns in an accident during the Rex Mays Classic at the Milwaukee Mile, doctors asked Hurtubise how he wanted his hands shaped permanently. "Just make 'em so I can hold a steering wheel," he replied.

Hurtubise died January 6, 1989 after suffering a heart attack near his home in Port Arthur, Texas. He was 56 years old. He is interred at Crown Hill Cemetery in Indianapolis.

Indianapolis 500
Hurtubise ran in ten Indianapolis 500 races between 1960 and 1974. His best finish was a 13th in 1962. Hurtubise was named the 1960 Indianapolis 500 Rookie of the Year.

In 1965, he qualified using a Novi engine, the last year that engine would be used in the race, have been considered 
obsolete several years before.  The engine failed on the first lap, and he finished last.

In 1966, he entered a rear-engined car, which was taking over from the front-engined roadsters as the standard for the race, and finished 17th.

After failing to qualify in 1967, in 1968 he ran the last front engined car to date in the race. He owned and had built the car himself, and named it the "Mallard". He claimed the car was lighter than previous roadsters, which would allow it to be competitive with the rear-engine cars.

From 1969 through 1971, he would continued to attempt to qualify the roadster, but failed to make the field, which was now fully rear-engined cars.

In 1972, he had qualified a rear-engine car 13th.  However on "bump day", he put the roadster, sponsored by Miller Beer in line to make a qualification attempt shortly before the closing deadline of 6:00 pm. The time expired before it was his turn to qualify.  He then removed the engine cover to reveal that the car had no engine, but five chilled cases of his sponsor's product, which he shared with the other pit crews and race officials

From 1973 through 1975, he attempted to qualify rear-engine cars, missing the field in 1973 and 1975, while qualifying 28th in 1974, finishing the race 28th after blowing the engine on lap 31. This would be the last year he would successfully qualify for the race.

For 1976, he was back in the Mallard. In 1978, while once again attempting to enter the roadster (a type of car which had now not qualified for the race in a decade) Tom Binford, the chief steward, refused to allow him an attempt to make the race, stating the car had not showed it was capable of race speed during practice. He then sat in entrant Bob Harkey’s car for ten minutes refusing to move. After finally leaving the car he ran on the track where he was tackled and apprehended by the police.

In subsequent years, he continued to attempt to get the Mallard into the field, with his final attempt in 1981. This was the final attempt for any front-engine car in the race, 13 years after the last time a car of that type had qualified for the race, and 17 years since the last time one had won.

Final race for the Mallard
In 1972, Hurtubise drove the Mallard in an IndyCar race at Michigan in 1972, qualifying 26th (last) and finishing 23rd. He drove the same car a year earlier at the Pocono 500, qualifying 33rd (last) and finishing 30th. This would be the last time a front-engine car ran in an IndyCar race.

NASCAR career

In 1957, Hurtubise started his NASCAR career running two races. Over the next twenty years, he would race 36 races, winning one race at Atlanta Motor Speedway, and amassing eleven top ten finishes.

Awards
He was inducted in the National Sprint Car Hall of Fame in 1993. Hurtubise was the 1998 pioneer selection for the Northeast Dirt Modified Hall of Fame.

Complete USAC Championship Car results

Complete PPG Indy Car Series results

Indianapolis 500 results

World Championship career summary
The Indianapolis 500 was part of the FIA World Championship from 1950 through 1960. Drivers competing at Indy during those years were credited with World Championship points and participation. Hurtubise participated in one World Championship race, finishing eighteenth and receiving no points.

References

External links
 
 Career statistics

NASCAR drivers
1932 births
1989 deaths
Indianapolis 500 drivers
Indianapolis 500 Rookies of the Year
American Speed Association drivers
National Sprint Car Hall of Fame inductees
People from North Tonawanda, New York
Racing drivers from New York (state)
Burials at Crown Hill Cemetery
USAC Silver Crown Series drivers
USAC Stock Car drivers
A. J. Foyt Enterprises drivers